Chropov is a village and municipality in Skalica District in the Trnava Region of western Slovakia.

History
In historical records the village was first mentioned in 1262.

Geography
The municipality lies at an altitude of 246 metres and covers an area of 17.794 km². It has a population of about 355 people.

Genealogical resources

The records for genealogical research are available at the state archive "Statny Archiv in Bratislava, Slovakia"

 Roman Catholic church records (births/marriages/deaths): 1635-1927 (parish A)

See also
 List of municipalities and towns in Slovakia

References

External links

 Official page

Surnames of living people in Chropov

Villages and municipalities in Skalica District